In the Kingdom of Nepal, the Governor of Palpa was the head of Palpa Gaunda (Province). This position was considered to be most important outside of the capital, Kathmandu. The Governor of Palpa was directly appointed by the prime minister.

Governors

References

Further reading 

 

Governors of provinces of Nepal
History of Lumbini Province
History of Nepal
Palpa District